John Paradise (1743–1795) was an Anglo-Greek linguist, known as a friend of Samuel Johnson and Fellow of the Royal Society.

Life
He was born at Thessalonica in April 1743, the son of Peter Paradise (died 1 February 1779), who was the English consul there. He was educated at Padua, then lived in London for most of his life in London. He knew ancient and modern Greek, Latin, Turkish, French, Italian, and English. Benjamin Franklin and Thomas Jefferson encouraged him to come to America. In correspondence with the latter in the 1780s, Paradise assisted Jefferson in studying the Greek language.

On 14 April 1769 Paradise was created M.A. of Oxford University, and on 3 July 1776 the degree of D.C.L. was conferred on him. He was elected Fellow of the Royal Society on 2 May 1771. His house was open to men of letters, and he entertained leading literary figures. Samuel Johnson dined with him, and on one occasion met Joseph Priestley there at dinner. When Johnson started an evening club at the Essex Head Tavern in Essex Street, London, in December 1783, Paradise was one of the regular attendants. Sir Joshua Reynolds, when discussing the club, enumerated him among the "very learned". He was one of the mourners at Johnson's funeral.

Paradise, a friend of Sir William Jones, was described as very silent, modest, and amiable. He lived at one time in Charles Street, Cavendish Square; he died at Great Titchfield Street, London, on 12 December 1795. He left money to buy mourning rings to nine: Isaac Hawkins Browne, Nathaniel Burwell, Bennet Langton, Samuel Horsley, Thomas Jefferson, Richard Warburton Lytton, Frederick North, William Windham, and Semyon Romanovich Woronzow.

Family
Paradise on 18 May 1769 married Lucy (1751–1814), daughter of Philip Ludwell III, a plantation owner from Virginia. Around 1805 after the death of her husband and two daughters she returned to Williamsburg, where she lived in the Ludwell-Paradise House.

Notes

External links
Attribution

John Paradise: The First Naturalized U.S. Citizen and Thomas Jefferson’s Greek-Language Tutor, Ludwell.org

The History of the Order of AHEPA - The First Greeks in the New World (Page 8)

1743 births
1795 deaths
Linguists from the United Kingdom
Fellows of the Royal Society